The Chaco Slope is a geographical region located in the northwestern portion of the U.S. state of New Mexico. It borders the Chaco Core, which contains both Chacra Mesa and Chaco Canyon. The canyon itself is noted for its Chacoan Anasazi ruins. The Chaco Slope is differentiated from the neighboring Chuska Valley, Chaco Core, and Chaco Plateau by distinct surface water drainage patterns and geological formations. These regions were first labelled by archaeologist Gwinn Vivian.

Citations

References 
 .

Colorado Plateau
Geology of New Mexico